Major General Sir Geoffrey Percy Thynne Feilding,  (21 September 1866 – 21 October 1932) was a senior British Army officer who served as Major-General commanding the Brigade of Guards and General Officer Commanding London District from 1918 to 1920.

Military career
Feilding was commissioned into the Coldstream Guards in April 1888, promoted to lieutenant on 27 November 1890, and to captain on 6 April 1898.

He served in the early part of the Second Boer War from 1899 to 1900 and was present in the engagements at Belmont in November 1899, being mentioned in despatches twice, and received the Distinguished Service Order (DSO). He returned to South Africa in 1902 commanding a battalion of mounted infantry and was granted the local rank of major on 20 April 1902. Following the end of the war in June 1902, he returned to the United Kingdom on board the SS Ortona, which arrived in Southampton in September that year.

Fielding later served in the First World War, being mentioned in despatches seven times.
He was appointed Commanding Officer of the 3rd Battalion Coldstream Guards in 1914. He went on to be commander of the 149th (Northumberland) Brigade in April 1915 and commander of the 1st Guards Brigade later that year. He was General Officer Commanding Guards Division from 1916 to 1918. A war memorial, unveiled by Feilding, honours the battlefield at Ginchy where many British soldiers from the Guards Division fell during the Battle of the Somme.

After the war he became Major-General commanding the Brigade of Guards and General Officer Commanding London District and then in 1923 he was made General Officer Commanding 56th (1st London) Division. He retired in 1927.

He is buried at St. Editha's Church in Monks Kirby.

References

 

|-

1866 births
1932 deaths
British Army major generals
Knights Commander of the Order of the Bath
Knights Commander of the Royal Victorian Order
Companions of the Order of St Michael and St George
Companions of the Distinguished Service Order
British Army personnel of the Second Boer War
British Army generals of World War I
Coldstream Guards officers
Burials in Warwickshire
Military personnel from London